Gordon Emmett "Pop" Lamkin (December 21, 1894 – June 11, 1972) was an American football coach. He was the 16th head football coach at The Apprentice School in Newport News, Virginia and he held that position for three seasons, from 1957 until 1959.  His coaching record at Apprentice was 13–8–1.

References

1894 births
1972 deaths
The Apprentice Builders football coaches
People from Pittsylvania County, Virginia